Zelah Clarke (born 5 April 1954) is a British actress who has mainly appeared in television productions.

Career 
Clarke had trained as a ballet dancer alongside Jenny Agutter and Fiona Fullerton. She began acting in smaller roles including West End musicals and theatre.

She started to work as a television actor in 1972, and her roles include Ceinwen Lloyd in How Green Was My Valley (1976) and Susan Nipper in Dombey and Son (1983). She also appeared in the first episode of Poldark (1975).

She is best known for playing Jane Eyre in the 1983 British television serial Jane Eyre, an adaptation of Charlotte Brontë's novel of the same name, produced for the BBC. The serial also starred Timothy Dalton as Edward Rochester.

Clarke lamented in an interview that the role of Jane had virtually ended her career.  She had received good reviews but work dried up while her co-star Timothy Dalton became a star. 

Zelah Clarke was nominated for a 1985 CableACE Award for Actress in a Movie or Miniseries for her portrayal of Jane Eyre.

She has continued to undertake voice work recording audiobooks including, Nina Bawdin's Outside Child and Carrie's War, and Three Legged Friends.

Reviews 
Ed Hulse from Barnes and Noble wrote of Clarke's performance, " ... [she] makes a properly soulful Jane: reserved but courageous in her quiet way." 

Mike Cummings for the All Movie Guide wrote, Rarely has a motion picture presented a tale of romance with such subtlety, sensitivity, and power as this 1983 Julian Amyes adaptation of the Charlotte Bronte classic Jane Eyre. Credit Zelah Clarke (Jane) and Timothy Dalton (Edward Fairfax Rochester) for the success of the film. Perfectly cast in their roles as lovers separated by untold secrets and repressed emotions, they act beautifully together, mixing chemistry and charisma to produce the kind of magic that holds audiences in thrall.

Private life 
Clarke is married to BBC executive producer Francis Ash and they have a daughter Lamorna.

Appearances Film/Television 
Sourced from IMDb

Selected Appearances Plays 
The plays were staged at the Open Air Theatre in Regents Park, London, all directed by David Conville, Richard Digby-Day and Christopher Biggins

Notes

1954 births
English radio actresses
English stage actresses
English television actresses
English voice actresses
Living people